John Frederick Amelung (1741–1798) was a German-American glass artist active in Maryland.

Biography
He was born in the free city of Bremen in either 1741 or 1742. A glassmaker by trade, Amelung immigrated to the newly formed United States in the late 1780s, arriving in the state of Maryland. In Maryland, he became the founder of the New Bremen Glass manufactory. The company had the support of people like George Washington, Thomas Jefferson, and Benjamin Franklin. He produced decorative glass similar to Stiegel glass from 1784 to about 1795. Some of the glass products contained engraved decorative ornaments in the German style. His business was successful, benefiting from the young American nation's desire for economic independence from Great Britain. A loan request for expansion was denied in 1790.

He died in Maryland in 1798.

References

John Frederick Amelung on Metropolitan Museum of Art website

1741 births
1798 deaths
German glass artists
Artists from Maryland
Artists from Bremen
German emigrants to the United States
American glass artists